OnGreen is an online social and business platform committed to cleantech technologies.  Entrepreneurs post plans to get connections, feedback and investment.  Companies and schools can post intellectual property on the site in the form of patents that can be licensed or sold.

History 
OnGreen, originally called Clean Green Guy, was founded in 2009 by Nikhil Jain. It was officially launched in March 2010 by Nikhil Jain and received majority seed funding in an amount of $1.4 million (US) in November 2010 from Shanghai-based Southern Hong Kong Investment Ltd. Shortly after the funding announcement, OnGreen launched its Patent Exchange.

Company 
OnGreen was originally based in West Los Angeles, California but has since relocated to Pasadena, California. Entrepreneurs post their deals on the Deal Marketplace.  OnGreen also allows governmental laboratories, companies, and schools to post intellectual property on the site in the form of patents that can be licensed or sold.  These patents are posted on the Patent Exchange.  There is also an Expert Panel, which consists of confirmed PhDs available to advise entrepreneurs or investors on the site.  The site also includes a green job board and online green technology forums.

Management
 Nikhil Jain, Founder & CEO
 Stanley Holt, COO
 Erik Steeb, Vice President, Business Development
 Dr. Mark Allen Bernstein, Senior Cleantech Advisor
 Mark Richards, CTO

Membership
Membership is free. Approximately 90% of the members are in the United States with the remainder of members stemming from 145 countries.

References

External links

Companies based in Los Angeles
Professional networks
Environmental technology